The Day of the Triffids is a 1963 British science fiction horror film in CinemaScope and Eastmancolor, produced by George Pitcher and Philip Yordan, and directed by Steve Sekely and Freddie Francis. It stars Howard Keel and Nicole Maurey, and is loosely based on the 1951 novel of the same name by John Wyndham. The film was released in the U.K. by the Rank Organisation and in the U.S. by Allied Artists.

Plot
A meteor shower blinds most people in the world and at the same time spreads triffid plant spores which quickly become animated. Bill Masen, a merchant navy officer who has been lying in hospital overnight with his eyes bandaged, is unaffected and leaves the next day. While at a railway station, he comes across an orphaned schoolgirl named Susan who, having spent the night in the luggage van, is unaffected too. He helps her escape the groping crowds and they commandeer an abandoned car in order to reach his ship. On their way the car gets stuck in mud and while they look for stones to gain traction a mobile triffid ambushes them and they barely escape.

Meanwhile, scientist Tom Goodwin and his wife Karen have been isolated in a lighthouse and only learn of the world emergency over the radio. Karen alerts Tom to a triffid growing on a ledge; inside they discover another and Tom has to battle it off. Though it appears dead, they discover that triffids can apparently regenerate themselves. The couple then barricade themselves in and set to work to discover some means of neutralising the plants.

After Masen and Susan finally make it to the dockyard, they only hear bad news from over the radio. They then cross into France, where they come across Christine Durant at a roadblock. She guides them to a chateau which is serving as a refuge for the blind. While looking for supplies at a grocery store with Mr Coker, a worker at the castle, they discover dozens of the plants, and Coker dies while they are returning to the chateau to warn the others. Later the place is invaded by escaped convicts and during the mayhem triffids move in and kill everyone except Tom, Susan and Christine, who manage to get away in the prison bus.

After discovering that Toulon is in flames, Masen next heads for the American naval base in Cádiz. On their way they encounter a blind couple, Luis de la Vega and his pregnant wife Teresa, and help her deliver a baby boy. Luis tells Masen that the Cadiz base has been evacuated by submarine since those who were underwater didn't get blinded by the meteor shower. Masen gets de Vega's radio transmitter working just in time to hear the navy broadcasting a message about a final survivor pickup in Alicante the next day and a warning to beware of wandering bands of triffids.

The group decides to leave early in the morning and Masen electrifies the enclosing fence around the villa during the night as a precaution. When triffids arrive, the current is too weak to hold them for long and Masen has to improvise a flamethrower from a fuel truck to keep them off. He also realizes that the triffids are attracted to sound, so he decoys them next day with a musical clown car while the others escape. He himself manages to attract the attention of a naval dinghy, which picks him up and takes him to the submarine.

Back at the lighthouse, the triffids manage to break in while Tom and Karen retreat to the top of the stairs. In a last effort to hold them off, Tom sprays them with a salt-water fire hose and the triffids begin to dissolve in a cloud of green smoke. Tom realizes that sea water was the answer they have been looking for all along and uses the hose to kill the rest of the Triffids in the lighthouse.

At the end, the narrator states that humanity has conquered the triffids by turning to the very thing that gave humans life in the beginning: sea water. Meanwhile, the people from the submarine have disembarked and are heading up to a church to give thanks for their survival.

Cast
 Howard Keel as Bill Masen
 Nicole Maurey as Christine Durant
 Janina Faye as Susan
 Janette Scott as Karen Goodwin
 Kieron Moore as Tom Goodwin
 Mervyn Johns as Mr. Coker
 Ewan Roberts as Dr. Soames
 Alison Leggatt as Miss Coker
 Geoffrey Matthews as Luis de la Vega
 Gilgi Hauser as Teresa de la Vega
 John Tate as Captain — S.S. Midland
 Carole Ann Ford as Bettina
 Arthur Gross as Flight 356 radioman
 Colette Wilde as Nurse Jamieson
 Ian Wilson as greenhouse watchman
 Victor Brooks as Poiret
 Peter Dyneley as the narrator's voice (uncredited)

Reception
Although the film retained some basic plot elements from Wyndham's novel, it is not a particularly faithful adaptation: "It strays significantly and unnecessarily from the book and is less well regarded than the BBC's intelligent (if dated) 1981 TV serial". Unlike in the novel, the triffids arrive from a meteor shower, some of the action is moved to Spain and an important character, Josella Playton, is deleted. Most seriously, the screenplay supplies a simplistic solution to the triffid problem: salt water dissolves them and "the world was saved".

Simon Clark, author of The Night of the Triffids, stated in an interview: "The film version is enjoyable, luring the effective looking Triffids away with music from an ice-cream van and some other good action scenes. The Triffids' death-by-seawater climax is weak and contrived though. But it would still rank in my all-time top 100 films".

Halliwell's Film Guide claimed the film was a "rough and ready adaptation of a famous sci-fi novel, sometimes blunderingly effective and with moments of good trick work".

Remake
In January 2014, it was announced that a remake was planned and would be directed by Mike Newell.

See also

 Chromolaena odorata
 The Day of the Triffids (1981 TV series)
 The Night of the Triffids, a 2001 sequel to Wyndham's book by Simon Clark
 The Day of the Triffids (2009 TV miniseries)

References

Bibliography
 Warren, Bill. Keep Watching the Skies, American Science Fiction Movies of the Fifties, Vol. II: 1958–1962. Jefferson, North Carolina: McFarland & Company, 1986. .

External links

 
 
 
 
 Rerecording of Ron Goodwin's musical score from The Day of the Triffids

1962 films
1960s monster movies
1960s science fiction horror films
Allied Artists films
British monster movies
British science fiction horror films
1960s dystopian films
Films scored by Ron Goodwin
Films about plants
Films about blind people
Films based on British novels
Films based on science fiction novels
Films directed by Steve Sekely
Films set in Cornwall
Films set in France
Films set in London
Giant monster films
British natural horror films
British post-apocalyptic films
Works set in lighthouses
1960s English-language films
1960s British films